Chalciope (means "bronze-face"), in Greek mythology, is a name that may refer to several characters.

 Chalciope, daughter of King Aeëtes of Colchis, sister of Medea and wife of Phrixus, by whom she had four sons: Argus, Phrontis, Melas and Cytisorus (some authors add Presbon). When Aeetes was dethroned and banished by his brother Perses, Chalciope expressed great filial devotion and stayed by her father's side, even though he had killed her husband. Hesiod referred to her as Iophossa, and Pherecydes as Euenia.
Chalciope, daughter of Rhexenor (or of King Chalcodon of Euboea) and the second wife of Aegeas, with whom he had no heirs.
Chalciope, daughter of Eurypylus of Cos, mother of Thessalus by Heracles.
Chalciope, consort of the aforementioned Thessalus, mother of his son Antiphus, presumably also of Pheidippus and Nesson.
Chalciope or Chalcippe, daughter of Phalerus.
Chalciope, mother of the musician Linus by Apollo.

Notes

References 

 Athenaeus of Naucratis, The Deipnosophists or Banquet of the Learned. London. Henry G. Bohn, York Street, Covent Garden. 1854. Online version at the Perseus Digital Library.
 Athenaeus of Naucratis, Deipnosophistae. Kaibel. In Aedibus B.G. Teubneri. Lipsiae. 1887. Greek text available at the Perseus Digital Library.
 Gaius Julius Hyginus, Fabulae from The Myths of Hyginus translated and edited by Mary Grant. University of Kansas Publications in Humanistic Studies. Online version at the Topos Text Project.
 Homer, The Iliad with an English Translation by A.T. Murray, Ph.D. in two volumes. Cambridge, MA., Harvard University Press; London, William Heinemann, Ltd. 1924. Online version at the Perseus Digital Library.
 Homer, Homeri Opera in five volumes. Oxford, Oxford University Press. 1920. Greek text available at the Perseus Digital Library.
 Lucius Mestrius Plutarchus, Moralia with an English Translation by Frank Cole Babbitt. Cambridge, MA. Harvard University Press. London. William Heinemann Ltd. 1936. Online version at the Perseus Digital Library. Greek text available from the same website.
 Pausanias, Description of Greece with an English Translation by W.H.S. Jones, Litt.D., and H.A. Ormerod, M.A., in 4 Volumes. Cambridge, MA, Harvard University Press; London, William Heinemann Ltd. 1918. Online version at the Perseus Digital Library
 Pausanias, Graeciae Descriptio. 3 vols. Leipzig, Teubner. 1903.  Greek text available at the Perseus Digital Library.
 Pseudo-Apollodorus, The Library with an English Translation by Sir James George Frazer, F.B.A., F.R.S. in 2 Volumes, Cambridge, MA, Harvard University Press; London, William Heinemann Ltd. 1921. Online version at the Perseus Digital Library. Greek text available from the same website.
 Strabo, The Geography of Strabo. Edition by H.L. Jones. Cambridge, Mass.: Harvard University Press; London: William Heinemann, Ltd. 1924. Online version at the Perseus Digital Library.
 Strabo, Geographica edited by A. Meineke. Leipzig: Teubner. 1877. Greek text available at the Perseus Digital Library.

Princesses in Greek mythology
Queens in Greek mythology
Women of Heracles
Colchian characters in Greek mythology
Euboean characters in Greek mythology